This article is about the particular significance of the year 1858 to Wales and its people.

Incumbents

Lord Lieutenant of Anglesey – Henry Paget, 2nd Marquess of Anglesey 
Lord Lieutenant of Brecknockshire – John Lloyd Vaughan Watkins
Lord Lieutenant of Caernarvonshire – Sir Richard Williams-Bulkeley, 10th Baronet 
Lord Lieutenant of Cardiganshire – Edward Pryse
Lord Lieutenant of Carmarthenshire – John Campbell, 1st Earl Cawdor 
Lord Lieutenant of Denbighshire – Robert Myddelton Biddulph   
Lord Lieutenant of Flintshire – Sir Stephen Glynne, 9th Baronet
Lord Lieutenant of Glamorgan – Christopher Rice Mansel Talbot
Lord Lieutenant of Merionethshire – Robert Davies Pryce 
Lord Lieutenant of Monmouthshire – Capel Hanbury Leigh
Lord Lieutenant of Montgomeryshire – Charles Hanbury-Tracy, 1st Baron Sudeley (until 10 February); Thomas Hanbury-Tracy, 2nd Baron Sudeley (from 4 March)
Lord Lieutenant of Pembrokeshire – Sir John Owen, 1st Baronet
Lord Lieutenant of Radnorshire – John Walsh, 1st Baron Ormathwaite

Bishop of Bangor – Christopher Bethell 
Bishop of Llandaff – Alfred Ollivant 
Bishop of St Asaph – Thomas Vowler Short 
Bishop of St Davids – Connop Thirlwall

Events
January
Teaching begins at Bangor Normal College, founded by Hugh Owen.
End of Aberdare Strike 1857-8 in the coal mining industry.
20 April – John Jones (Shoni Sguborfawr) is given a conditional pardon for his role in the Rebecca Riots.
June – Erection of the Town Clock at Tredegar.
20 June – End of the Indian Rebellion of 1857, which Major General Charles Hinde plays a major role in suppressing.
29 August – Musician Robert Davies (Asaph Llechid) is killed by a rockfall while at work in Cae-braich-y-cafn quarry.
5 October – The Vale of Clwyd Railway, built by David Davies Llandinam, is opened.
13 October – 20 men are killed in a mining accident at Lower Duffryn Colliery, Mountain Ash.
date unknown
The schooner Mary Catherine, launched at Amlwch, is the first iron ship built in Wales.
Richard Kyrke Penson exhibits a plan of his design for the Cilyrychen lime kilns at the Royal Academy.

Arts and literature

Awards
"Great Eisteddfod" at Llangollen; early appearance of Gorsedd ceremony.  Ebenezer Thomas (Eben Fardd) wins first prize for his poem Maes Bosworth.

New books
William Davies (Gwilym Teilo) — Llandilo-Vawr and its Neighbourhood
Owen Wynne Jones — Lleucu Llwyd
Robert Owen — An Introduction to the Study of Dogmatic Theology
L. M. Spooner (anonymously) — Gladys of Harlech
Alfred Russel Wallace — On the Tendency of Varieties to Depart Indefinitely From the Original Type

Music
Thomas Gruffydd Jones (Tafalaw Bencerdd) — Y Drysorfa Gorawl
Edward Stephen (Tanymarian) — Requiem

Births
6 January — Ben Davies, singer (died 1943)
28 January — Edgeworth David, explorer (died 1934)
9 April — Aneurin Rees, Wales rugby union international (died 1932)
15 May — B. B. Mann, Wales rugby union international (died 1948)
8 October — Robert Owen Hughes (Elfyn), journalist and poet (died 1919)
25 October — Tom Clapp, Wales rugby union captain
30 October - Alfred Onions, politician (died 1921)
18 December — Sir Owen Thomas, soldier and politician
25 December — Frederick Margrave, rugby player (died 1946)
26 December — Sir Owen Morgan Edwards, academic and author (died 1920)
27 December — Sir John Herbert Lewis, lawyer and politician (died 1933)
28 December — Josiah Towyn Jones, politician (died 1925)

Deaths
10 February — Charles Hanbury-Tracy, 1st Baron Sudeley, Lord Lieutenant of Montgomeryshire, 79
22 March — Mary Anne Edmunds, educator and feminist, 41
19 April — John Davies, Unitarian minister and teacher, 62/63
13 May — Lewis Loyd, banker, 91
30 May — Thomas ap Catesby Jones, Welsh-descended US naval officer, 68
4 June — Thomas Edwards (Caerfallwch), lexicographer, 78
16 October — Charles Norris, artist, 79
17 November — Robert Owen, founder of the Co-operative Society, 87
20 November — Sir Joseph Bailey, 1st Baronet, ironmaster, 75
18 December — John Salusbury Piozzi Salusbury, nephew of Hester Thrale, 65
27 December — John Williams, Archdeacon of Cardigan and warden of Llandovery College, 66

References

 
Wales